These hits topped the Ultratop 50 in the Flanders region of Belgium in 1980.

See also
1980 in music

References

1980 in Belgium
1980 record charts
1980